Faith Academy Senior Secondary  School is an unaided Christian minority senior secondary school located in Prasad Nagar, New Delhi, India.  It is located near the Prasad Nagar Jheel (pond). Faith Academy is a recognized, unaided, co-educational, Christian minority senior secondary school. It operates under the direction and control of the Christian Educational Society through the Managing Committee of Faith Academy.

The principal is Dr M.Kannan who is a physics teacher. The school is adapting itself to modern technology by installing LCD screens in most of the classes. There are fully operational Audio Visual Room, School Library, Canteen, Medical Care and Eden Kidz Zone. Every year the school participate in various competitions including various bible quiz events and also hosts its own to proclaim the glory of God. The school is victorious in many of the bible quizzes, the latest being the YMCA bible quiz held on 31 November 2017. The school also hosts biennial athletic meet or annual day. It has now also developed a third phase with various facilities. It is also among the schools that has a hydraulic stage in usage.

History
Faith Academy was established by seven Christians on 15 January 1963, in a residential building at 13/15 East Patel Nagar with twelve students and six teachers. The school grew but remained in seven residential buildings. The school moved to its current school building.

Social Services

Faith Child Development Centre(FCDC)
The Faith Child Development Centre is an after 2:00 p.m. project for students from the government schools. The Faith Child Development Centre was opened in 2009. It now has 124 students and 7 teachers plus a coordinator, tutoring students of Class I to VI.

The project aims at:
 giving access to education,
 giving a hot nutritious meal five days a week,
 giving fluency in English and Hindi.
 fun trips/picnics/projects/workshops.

Social Work and Counselling
Career counselling is another area of work. Another initiative of the department is the identification and referral of children with learning disabilities.

Kindergarten
The school has branches called little flock as pre-school in various places like Goa and Delhi

References

External links
School website
Accident report in The Hindu
Art Teachers workshop in The Hindu
Faith Academy Art Gallery
Slides (?)
Little Flock

Schools in Delhi
Educational institutions established in 1963
1963 establishments in Delhi